Emmanouil "Manolis" "Manos" Papamakarios (Greek: Εμμανουήλ "Μανόλης" "Μάνος" Παπαμακάριος; born August 26, 1980) is a retired Greek professional basketball player. He is 1.92 m (6 ft 3  in) tall and he mainly played as a shooting guard, but he could also play at the point guard, point forward, and small forward positions.

Professional playing career
Born in Athens, Greece, Papamakarios began his professional basketball career with the Greek League club Peristeri in 1998. He then moved to Makedonikos in 2004, and then to Olympiacos Piraeus in 2005. After spending three seasons with Olympiacos Piraeus, he decided to leave the team in 2008, when he signed a two-year contract with Panellinios.

He then moved to the Spanish League club GBC. He joined the Greek club Panelefsiniakos in 2013. On December 3, 2014 he signed with Greek club KAOD.

In 2015, Papamakarios signed with the emerging powerhouse, Faros Keratsiniou, of the Greek A2 League.

In 2016, he signed with the Greek 2nd Division club Doukas. In 2017, he joined the Greek club Gymnastikos Faros Larissas.

On July 12, 2018, Papamakarios announced his official retirement from playing professional basketball in a letter, but in the same letter he also mentioned that he would remain close to the sport in another capacity. Later that same day, he became the sports director of Ifaistos Limnou.

National team career
Papamakarios won the bronze medal at the 1998 FIBA Europe Under-18 Championship with Greece's junior national team. He also played at the 1999 FIBA Under-19 World Cup, and at the 2000 FIBA Europe Under-20 Championship. He was also a member of the senior men's Greek national basketball team.

Post-playing career
After he retired from playing professional basketball, Papamakarios became the sports director of Ifaistos Limnou, in 2018.

Awards and accomplishments

Player
1998 FIBA Europe Under-18 Championship: 
2× Greek League All-Star: (2007, 2010)

References

External links
Twitter Account
Euroleague.net Profile
FIBA Profile
FIBA Europe Profile
Eurobasket.com Profile
Spanish League Profile 
Greek League Profile 
Panellinios BC star: Manolis Papamakarios

1980 births
Living people
Baloncesto Fuenlabrada players
Doukas B.C. players
Faros Keratsiniou B.C. players
Gipuzkoa Basket players
Greek basketball executives and administrators
Greek men's basketball players
Greek expatriate basketball people in Spain
Greek Basket League players
Gymnastikos S. Larissas B.C. players
K.A.O.D. B.C. players
Liga ACB players
Makedonikos B.C. players
Olympiacos B.C. players
Panelefsiniakos B.C. players
Panellinios B.C. players
Peristeri B.C. players
Point guards
Shooting guards
Small forwards
Basketball players from Athens